Eastwick could refer to:

Locations
Eastwick, Philadelphia, Pennsylvania, a neighborhood
Eastwick (SEPTA station), a railway station on the Airport Line to Philadelphia International Airport
"Eastwick", a slang name for Elizabeth, New Jersey
Eastwick, Hertfordshire, a village and civil parish in England
Eastwick, London, a new town to be built on the site of Olympic Park, east of Hackney Wick

People
Edward Backhouse Eastwick (1814-1883), British orientalist, diplomat and Conservative Member of Parliament.
Rawly Eastwick (born 1950), former Major League Baseball relief pitcher.

Entertainment
Eastwick (TV series), a 2009 American television series.
The Witches of Eastwick, a 1984 American novel by John Updike.
The Witches of Eastwick (film), a 1987 American horror comedy directed by George Miller, based on the same-named novel.

See also
 Eastwich, Indiana, an unincorporated community in Fairfield Township, Tippecanoe County